Casino Miami (formerly known as Miami Jai-Alai Fronton) is a 6,500-capacity indoor arena and casino located at 3500 NW 37th Avenue in Miami, Florida. Today, it is primarily used for gambling and concerts. Notable past performers include the Allman Brothers Band, Black Sabbath, Bruce Springsteen, Frank Sinatra, Santana and Grateful Dead. In the past, Jai alai matches took place there, the last one being held in January 2021. Likewise, the arena had been used 89 times for boxing events, including many involving famous former world champion boxers. After a bankruptcy, an affiliate of ABC Funding acquired Casino Miami in 2014.

See also 
 Sport in Miami

References

External links

Basque pelota in the United States
Casinos in Florida
Indoor arenas in Florida
Music venues in Florida
Boxing venues in the United States